The enzyme dimethylmaleate hydratase catalyzes the chemical reaction

(2R,3S)-2,3-dimethylmalate  dimethylmaleate + H2O

This enzyme belongs to the family of lyases, specifically the hydro-lyases, which cleave carbon-oxygen bonds.  The systematic name of this enzyme class is (2R,3S)-2,3-dimethylmalate hydro-lyase (dimethylmaleate-forming). This enzyme is also called (2R,3S)-2,3-dimethylmalate hydro-lyase.  This enzyme participates in c5-branched dibasic acid metabolism.  It employs one cofactor, iron.

References

 

EC 4.2.1
Iron enzymes
Enzymes of unknown structure